Louisa Edith Church Maryon (9 February 1872, in London – 2 May 1924, in Dornach, Switzerland), better known as Edith Maryon, was an English sculptor. Along with Ita Wegman, she belonged to the innermost circle of founders of anthroposophy and those around Rudolf Steiner.

Life and work 

Edith Maryon was the second of six children. Her parents were John Maryon Simeon and his wife Louisa Church who lived in London where she grew up. She attended a girls school and later went to a boarding school in the Swiss city of Geneva. During the 1890s she studied sculpture in London at the Central School of Design, and from 1896 at the Royal College of Arts. She exhibited at the Royal Academy. Her works of that period showed her leaning toward the subject of Christianity, such as a model of Michael, the relief The Seeker of Divine Wisdom and The Cross of Golgotha.

Maryon met Rudolf Steiner in 1912/13 and after the summer of 1914 she moved to Dornach. She worked with Steiner on the construction of the first Goetheanum, and with him on the modelling and carving of the wooden sculpture The Representative of Humanity. Steiner designed the nine-metre high sculpture to be placed in the first Goetheanum. Now on permanent display at the second Goetheanum, it shows a central, free-standing Christ holding a balance between the beings of Lucifer and Ahriman, representing opposing tendencies of expansion and contraction. The sculpture was intended to present, in contrast to Michelangelo's Last Judgment, Christ as mute and impersonal such that the beings that approach him must judge themselves.

At a foundation meeting held during Christmas 1923 Steiner nominated Maryon as leader of the Section for the Plastic Arts at the Goetheanum (or Sculptural Arts) (German Sektion für Bildende Künste). The following May, she died of tuberculosis.

References

Further reading 
 Rembert Biemond, Edith Maryon, in Anthroposophy in the 20th Century: e. Kulturimpuls in biographical portraits. Edited by Bodo von Plato. Dornach: Verlag am Goetheanum, 2003. 
  
 Rex Raab, Edith Maryon, Sculptor and Associate of Rudolf Steiner, a biography [...]. Dornach: Philosophisch-anthroposophical Verlag am Goetheanum, 1993.

External links 

 Literature by and about Edith Maryon in the catalog of the German National Library
 Edith Maryon Foundation

1872 births
1924 deaths
19th-century British sculptors
19th-century English women artists
20th-century British sculptors
20th-century English women artists
Alumni of the Royal College of Art
Artists from London
Anthroposophists
English women sculptors